Statistics of Nemzeti Bajnokság I for the 1911–12 season.

Overview
It was contested by 10 teams, and Ferencvárosi TC won the championship.

League standings

Results

References
Hungary - List of final tables (RSSSF)

1911-12
1
1911–12 in European association football leagues